Saiful Azam Kashem (31 December 1947 – 11 March 2019) was a Bangladeshi film director. He directed many Dhallywood movies.

Biography
Kashem was born on 31 December 1947 in Comilla. His debut direction was Ontorale. He directed films like Sohag, Ghor Songsar, Duniadari, Halchal and Swamir Adesh. These films are selected for preservation in Bangladesh Film Archive.

Kashem died on 11 March 2019 at the age of 71 in Apollo Hospital, Dhaka.

Selected filmography
 Ontorale
 Sohag
 Ghor Songsar
 Bourani
 Sanai
 Dhondoulot
 Duniadari
 Halchal
 Vorosa
 Swamir Adesh
 Tyajyoputro

References

2019 deaths
Bangladeshi film directors
1947 births
People from Comilla District